Paragus albifrons, is a species of hoverfly. It is found from southern Europe across to eastern Asia.

References

Diptera of Europe
Syrphinae
Insects described in 1817